G♯ (G-sharp) or sol dièse is the ninth semitone of the solfège. In the German pitch nomenclature, it is known as gis.

It lies a chromatic semitone above G and a diatonic semitone below A, thus being enharmonic to la bémol or A (A-flat).

When calculated in equal temperament with a reference of A above middle C as 440 Hz, the frequency of the G♯ semitone is approximately 415.305 Hz. See pitch (music) for a discussion of historical variations in frequency.

The notes A and G are the only notes to have only one enharmonic, since they cannot be reached in any other way by a single or double sharp or a single or double flat from any of the seven white notes.

Designation by octave

Scales

Common scales beginning on G
 G major: G A B C D E F G
 G natural minor: G A B C D E F G
 G harmonic minor: G A B C D E F G
 G melodic minor Ascending: G A B C D E F G
 G melodic minor descending: G F E D C B A G

Diatonic scales
 G Ionian: G A B C D E F G
 G Dorian: G A B C D E F G
 G Phrygian: G A B C D E F G
 G Lydian: G A B C D E F G
 G Mixolydian: G A B C D E F G
 G Aeolian: G A B C D E F G
 G Locrian: G A B C D E F G

Jazz melodic minor
 G ascending melodic minor: G A B C D E F G
 G Dorian ♭2: G A B C D E F G
 G Lydian augmented: G A B C D E F G
 G Lydian dominant: G A B C D E F G
 G Mixolydian ♭6: G A B C D E F G
 G Locrian ♮2: G A B C D E F G
 G altered: G A B C D E F G

See also
 Piano key frequencies
 G-sharp major
 G-sharp minor
 Root (chord)
 G-sharp guitar

References

Musical notes